Tanjong Bunga is a state constituency in Penang, Malaysia, that has been represented in the Penang State Legislative Assembly since 1959. It covers the suburbs of George Town along the northern coast of Penang Island, including Batu Ferringhi, Tanjung Bungah and parts of Tanjung Tokong.

The state constituency was first contested in 1959 and is mandated to return a single Assemblyman to the Penang State Legislative Assembly under the first-past-the-post voting system. , the State Assemblyman for Tanjong Bunga is Zairil Khir Johari from the Democratic Action Party (DAP), which is part of the state's ruling coalition, Pakatan Harapan (PH).

Definition

Polling districts 
According to the federal gazette issued on 30 March 2018, the Tanjong Bunga constituency is divided into 7 polling districts.

Thus, the northernmost suburbs of George Town - Batu Ferringhi, Tanjung Bungah and the northern part of Tanjung Tokong (up to Jalan Gajah and Tanjung Tokong Road) - fall under this state seat. It also encompasses the newly created neighbourhood of Seri Tanjung Pinang at Tanjung Tokong, which was reclaimed from the sea in the early 2000s.

Demographics

History 
The Tanjong Bunga state constituency was originally named Tanjong Bungah when it was created prior to the 1959 State Election. It was then renamed in time for the 1974 State Election.

Tanjong Bungah was one of the first state seats in Penang to be captured by the then fledgling DAP in 1969.

Koh Tsu Koon, a Gerakan politician, first won the Tanjong Bunga constituency in 1990 and was subsequently appointed as the Chief Minister of Penang. Koh held the seat until 2008, when he announced his intention to step down from his position as the Chief Minister.

During the State Election later that year, the constituency was wrested from the Barisan Nasional (BN) federal ruling coalition by Teh Yee Cheu, then a DAP politician. Teh held Tanjong Bunga until the 2018 State Election, when DAP's Zairil Khir Johari, who was selected to replace the former, won the constituency.

Election results 
The electoral results for the Tanjong Bunga state constituency in 2008, 2013 and 2018 are as follows.

See also 
 Constituencies of Penang

References 
 

Penang state constituencies